The men's qualification for the Olympic field hockey tournament will occur between August 2023 and the early quarter of 2024, allocating twelve teams for the final tournament. All five FIH (International Hockey Federation) zones are expected to have a continental representation in the Olympic field hockey event.

The host nation France receives a direct quota place in the men's tournament after having attained the top twenty-five spot or higher in the FIH world ranking list. The remaining half of the field will attribute the quota places to the top three teams in each of the two separate FIH Olympic qualifying tournaments.

Method
Twelve teams will participate in the men's field hockey tournament, with each NOC sending a roster of sixteen players and two substitutes.

Host nation
As the host nation, France receives a direct quota place in the men's tournament after having attained the top twenty-five spot or higher in the FIH world ranking list. If the French hockey players win the 2023 EuroHockey Championships, the number of places in two wildcard tournaments will rise to seven, with the remaining spot offered to the highest-ranked of the two bronze medal losers.

Continental qualification
The winners from each of the five confederation zones (Africa, Americas, Asia, Europe, and Oceania) in their respective tournaments listed below will secure a quota place for their respective NOC:
 Africa – 2023 African Games
 Americas – 2023 Pan American Games
 Asia – 2022 Asian Games
 Europe – 2023 EuroHockey Championship
 Oceania – 2023 Oceania Cup

Qualification via the wild card tournament
The remaining half of the total quota will be attributed to the eight-team field through each of the two separate FIH Olympic Qualifying Tournaments (OQTs), scheduled for the early quarter of 2024. The top three eligible NOCs at the end of each tournament will secure the berths to complete the twelve-team field for Paris 2024. If the host nation France wins the 2023 EuroHockey Championships, a seventh spot will be available in the OQTs to be eventually awarded to the highest-ranked of the two bronze medal losers at midnight on the final day of the second tournament.

The teams based on the continental quotas, determined by the number of NOCs from each continent within the top 22 of the FIH world ranking list, are eligible to participate in each of the two OQTs. From these quotas, six nations (the host nation France and five continental winners) qualified for Paris will be removed from the list, leaving the remainder to be filled by the highest-ranked eligible NOCs in each of the continental meets.

Qualified teams

2023 Oceania Cup

Pool

2023 African Games

2023 EuroHockey Championships

Qualified teams

Preliminary round

Pool A

Pool B

Final round

Final ranking

2022 Asian Games

2023 Pan American Games

Notes

See also
 Field hockey at the 2024 Summer Olympics – Women's qualification

References

 
Men
Qualification
Field hockey at the Summer Olympics – Men's qualification